Love Jones may refer to:

 Love Jones (film), a 1997 romantic drama film
 Love Jones (soundtrack), a soundtrack album from the film
 Love Jones (band), an American pop group
 "Love Jones", a 1972 song by Brighter Side of Darkness, or the same-titled 1973 album
 "Love Jones", a 2000 song by Eartha
 "Love Jones", a 2020 song by Lil Yachty from Lil Boat 3
 John Love Jones (1885–1913), Welsh footballer
 Sir Love Jones-Parry, 1st Baronet (1832–1891), Welsh politician
 Love Jones-Parry (British Army officer) (1781–1853), the Baronet's father